Sordid Humor was an American rock music band, formed in 1987 by the duo of Tom Barnes and Jim Gordon. The duo received help from drummers Ken Gregg, Chris Pedersen, and Toby Hawkins, and bassists Tony Fader, David Immergluck and Marty Jones.  

Barnes' unique vocal style and unusual phrasing was the trademark of Sordid Humor, and he went on to lend his vocals and alt-rock guitar style to Engine 88, and a solo project called the Blimp. Sordid Humor played a textured rock with layers of guitars and vocals that, at the time, could best be classified as college rock, releasing several independent releases before breaking up in 1992.

An EP entitled Tony Don't was released on vinyl in 1989 by Oedpius Records of San Francisco, CA. It contained the tracks "Jumping Jesus", "Apollo XIII", "First Goodbye", "Indian Ocean", and "Broken Desert". The only full-length album now available, Light Music For Dying People, was released after their breakup by Capricorn Records in 1994.

Despite their limited success, Sordid Humor's music has survived in the choices of college DJs. They are notable for bringing together three musicians of Counting Crows: Adam Duritz, who sang backing vocals on "Barbarossa" and several other tracks on Light Music, David Immerglück, who played bass on several tracks of the album, and David Bryson who produced several of their tracks. Duritz would later incorporate lyrics from Sordid Humor songs  "Private Archipelago", "Doris Day", and "Jumping Jesus" in Counting Crows performances, and Counting Crows would include a cover of "Jumping Jesus" on their album Underwater Sunshine.

Marty Jones also played bass on "Light Music".  He is the namesake for the Counting Crows song "Mr. Jones".

References

American rock music groups
American musical duos
Rock music duos
Counting Crows
Musical groups established in 1987
Musical groups disestablished in 1992
Capricorn Records artists